Nanodiodes piceus is a species of beetles in the family Carabidae, the only species in the genus Nanodiodes.

References

Licininae
Monotypic Carabidae genera